The themes of  have been the subject of continued casual and academic debate since the Japanese media franchise was created by Gainax. In Japan, a national debate about the anime Neon Genesis Evangelion resulted in widespread coverage of the show's endings and its retellings, contributing to the interest in academic analysis of the show. Most of the franchise features an apocalyptic mecha action story, which revolves around the efforts by the paramilitary organization NERV to fight hostile beings called Angels, using giant humanoids called Evangelions that are piloted by select teenagers. The psychological, religious, and philosophical themes explored in the work represent the majority of the discussion. Evangelion's influence in postmodern apocalyptic narratives on the "sekaikei" genre has been great, but it remains the most successful example.

Psychoanalysis

Evangelion has long been taken as a deeply personal expression of Hideaki Anno's personal struggles and his long battle with depression. From the start, Evangelion invokes many psychological themes. Phrases used in episodes, their titles, and the names of the background music frequently derive from Sigmund Freud's works, in addition to perhaps some Lacanian influences in general. Examples include "Thanatos", "Oral stage", "Separation Anxiety", and "Mother Is the First Other" (the basis of the Oedipus complex is that the mother is the first object of the child's love). The scenery and buildings in Tokyo-3 often seem laden with psychological import, even in the first episode.

Many of the characters have deep psychological traumas in relation to their parents. Shinji's introversion and social anxiety stem from the death of his mother at an early age and his abandonment by his father. Asuka was the target of her mother's insanity, and discovered her mother's body after she hanged herself; her tough, bullying personality is a means of distracting herself from her pain, and she has made piloting Unit 02 her only source of pride and satisfaction. Misato's father neglected her when she was a child; after he was killed in the Second Impact, she stopped talking for a couple of years. In episode 25, Misato states that she was both attracted to and afraid of Ryoji Kaji because he reminded her of her father. Similarly, many scenes overlap images of Shinji's mother with images of his potential lovers, both lining up with Freudian theories. Ritsuko saw her mother having an affair with Gendo Ikari; after her mother's suicide she felt both attraction and hate towards Gendo. Indeed, the last two episodes are "stripped of the high-tech gadgetry and the colorful visuals that characterize the earlier episodes in the series, these last two episodes take place largely in muted tones… a form of interrogation proceeds to be carried out as he [Shinji] asks himself—or is asked by an unseen voice—probing psychological questions." The questions elicit unexpected answers, particularly the ones dealing with Shinji's motivation for piloting the Eva—he feels worthless and afraid of others (especially his father) if he is not piloting the Eva. Asuka and Rei are also depicted in deep introspection and consideration of their psyches. Asuka comes to the realization that her entire being is caught up in being a competent Eva pilot and that without it, she has no personal identity: "I'm the junk… I'm worthless. Nobody needs a pilot who can't control her own Eva." Rei, who throughout the series has displayed minimal emotion, reveals that she does have one impulse; it is Thanatos, an inclination to death: "I am Happy. Because I want to die, I want to despair, I want to return to nothing." In episode 25 Shinji and Asuka both show that they in fact suffered similar pasts and found different ways of dealing with it. This is further established in Shinji when he claims he has no life without Eva and this is disproven by the world shown in episode 26 followed by the famous "Congratulations" scene.

Religion
The most prominent symbolism takes its inspiration from Christian sources and frequently uses iconography and themes from Christianity, Islam, Gnosticism, and Kabbalism, in the series's examination of religious ideas and themes. Anno suggested a grand theme with the work including the nature of evolution, the existence of God and its impact on humanity.

Assistant director Kazuya Tsurumaki said that they originally used Christian symbolism and themes only to give the project a unique edge against other giant robot shows, that there is no Christian meaning to the series and that it was not meant to be controversial (although it was). Hiroki Sato, head of Gainax's PR department, has made similar statements, as has Toshio Okada. Anno has said that Eva is susceptible to multiple interpretations. Austin Carpentieri has argued, that while these statements are most likely true, this only precludes a Christian meaning and not a biblical one: "It would be tantamount to critical malpractice to suggest that the show has absolutely nothing to do with the Bible, or Biblical tradition".

The "Angels" are a reference to the angels of God from the Old Testament, most of which bear the same names. In 1993, the Evangelion proposal presented the angels, including names and appearances. The most important angels are Adam and Lilith. The first Angel is named Adam, just as the biblical Adam is the first man created by God. The second Angel is named Lilith, a reference to the Jewish folklore in which Lilith is the first wife of Adam. Lilith is shown crucified and impaled with a spear named the "Lance of Longinus", the same lance used to pierce the side of Jesus Christ during his crucifixion, according to the Gospel of Nicodemus. Eve or Eva comes from Adam's rib; similarly, the Evangelions come from the Angel first identified as Adam. The goal of the Angels are to return to Adam and create the Third Impact which would destroy mankind, Kaworu Nagisa recognizes humanity as beings of Lilith and identifies them as Lilim. Several times throughout the series, the defeat of an Angel results in a Christian cross shaped explosion.

The Magi supercomputers of NERV are named Melchior, Balthasar and Caspar after the names traditionally given for the Magi who were mentioned in the Gospel of Matthew as having visited Jesus Christ in Bethlehem. The Marduk Institute is a front organization for Nerv, tasked with finding the teenagers suitable for piloting Evangelion units. Marduk was the name of the chief Babylonian deity and patron god of the city of Babylon. The Tree of Sephiroth (Tree of Life) is mentioned, as well as shown in the opening title sequence and in Gendo's office, with Hebrew inscriptions on it (the terms written there are mostly Kabbalic). It also appears in The End of Evangelion during Seele's version of Instrumentality. SEELE's logo is a reference to biblical descriptions of God having seven eyes (Zechariah 3:9, the "stone with seven eyes", and Revelation 5:6, where the Lamb of God has seven eyes).

Broderick writes, "Anno's project is a postmodernist retelling of the Genesis myth, as his series title implies—Neon Genesis Evangelion. It is a new myth of origin, complete with its own deluge, Armageddon, apocalypse and transcendence." Other analysts bring additional views that include a combination of religious and psychological themes, where Kraemer's views diverge from Broderick's, but affirm several themes including Shinji as a messiah figure. Carpentieri writes, "Eva’s message for our age is one that radically and bravely attempts to upend, deconstruct, and recontextualize an understanding of Biblical narrative in a useful way."

Philosophy
Themes of individuality, consciousness, freedom, choice, and responsibility are heavily relied upon throughout the entire series, particularly through the philosophies of Søren Kierkegaard. Episode 16's title is a reference to Kierkegaard's book, "The Sickness Unto Death". "The sickness unto death" refers to "despair", and in the introduction of this work, Kierkegaard says that, "Even death itself is not 'the sickness unto death'. Not to mention any of the suffering on Earth known as destitution, illness, misery, privations, misfortune, pain, anguish, grief, or regret." The Human Instrumentality Project may be inspired by the philosophy developed by Johann Gottlieb Fichte and Georg Wilhelm Friedrich Hegel, while some existentialist ideas appearing in the work could also be found in Jean-Paul Sartre's Being and Nothingness and Martin Heidegger's Being and Time. The title of Episode 4, "The Hedgehog's Dilemma", is a reference to the Hedgehog's dilemma, Arthur Schopenhauer's analogy about the challenges of human intimacy. Evangelion: 3.0 You Can (Not) Redo introduced the organisation WILLE, whose name is derived from the Schopenhauerian concept of the Will.

Identity and hybridity
Orbaugh notes that "the young protagonists incarnate monstrosity/hybridity in several ways simultaneously", highlighting their cyborgization with the Evangelions and the "Angel" DNA which allows their synchronization, with additional hybridity for the mixed race Asuka and the cloned Rei.

Sexuality and gender
Shinji's integration with the Evangelion presents a unique concept of "inter-corporation", where Shinji and the Evangelion penetrate and fill each other, which is further expressed by the analogous sexual intercourse taking place, with the male Shinji taking a female role. Combined with the resulting and literal Oedipal complex, the act raises questions about gender and sexual identity. In another discussion, Orbaugh highlights that the inter-corporation of a female allows for the weapons to defeat the Angels and that the male terror of being radically feminized, inter-penetrated and inter-corporated, shows the need to embrace the "abject femininity—permeability/penetrability—that is repressed in techno-patriarchal society." Yoshiyuki Sadamoto has described the feminine character design for Shinji, describing how he was initially essentially a male version of Nadia from Nadia: The Secret of Blue Water, and how his relationship with Asuka was modeled on Nadia's own relationship with Jean, Nadia's love interest and eventual husband in the series.

Notes

References

Further reading
My Father, He Killed Me; My Mother, She Ate Me: Self, Desire, Engendering, and the Mother in Neon Genesis Evangelion by Mariana Ortega, Mechademia, Volume 2, 2007, University of Minnesota Press. pp. 216–232. 

Neon Genesis Evangelion
Neon Genesis Evangelion
Christianity in popular culture
Hebrew Bible in popular culture 
Jews and Judaism in fiction 
Films about psychoanalysis